Moalboal, officially the Municipality of Moalboal,  is a 4th class municipality in the province of Cebu, Philippines. According to the 2020 census, it has a population of 36,930 people.

Geography
Extending as a peninsula on the south-western tip of Cebu, Moalboal is bordered to the west by the Tañon Strait. Negros Island can be seen from the western shoreline.

Moalboal is bordered to the north by the town of Alcantara, to the west is the Tañon Strait, to the east is the town of Argao, and to the south is the town of Badian.

Pescador Island, a popular tourist attraction, is part of the municipality.

Barangays
Moalboal comprises 15 barangays:

Climate

Demographics

Though the majority of the people in Moalboal are Cebuanos, a few members of cultural minorities have found their way there. Bajaus who are similar to Muslim nomads, are often seen in the streets, especially during the holiday season, as some of them make their living by begging. There is no evidence though that the badjaos have taken up permanent residence in the town.

Due to the tourism boom that the town has experienced in the 2000s and 2010s, a small contingent of expatriates have also started to settle in Moalboal. Europeans and Americans are the most prominent expatriates in the town, but recently, expatriates from East Asian countries have also started to settle in the area.

Economy

Moalboal is a peninsula and therefore it is almost entirely surrounded by water. The majority of the people who live in the flat lands engage in fishing as their main mode of livelihood. Those who live in the mountain regions, like Agbalanga and Bala, live through farming.

The common mode of transportation is by bicycles with side cars, known locally as pedicabs or, depending on the distance, tricycles with side cars, called trisikads.

Tourism

 

Since the 1970s, Moalboal has developed a tourism industry based on recreational diving and beaches. Panagsama Beach (Basidot) is where most resorts and restaurants are established, while further north on the peninsula, in Saavedra, is White Beach (Basdako), a  beach. This beach used to be mostly frequented by locals, but has since developed an international tourist trade.

 
Recreational diving is the main tourist activity in Moalboal, and reefs along the west coast of the Copton peninsula are home to a great variety of marine life. The area is also known to be a sanctuary for sea turtles, as well as vast schools of sardines. nearby Pescadores Suites. Whale shark, dolphins and threshers are also seen out of the blue. 

Moalboal has been featured by several Filipino TV show hosts, such as Kuya Kim Atienza of Matanglawin, Drew Arellano of Biyahe ni Drew, Slater Young, and Kryz Uy. Pol-kun, self-made renowned local Anime artists of Cebu which is one of the supporters for Moalboal too. 
 

Fiesta 

The annual feast of Moalboal is held on the 15 and 16 of May. Moalboal is known also for its "Kagasangan Festival" (coral) in which they perform tribal dances and music. It is held in honor of St. John of Nepomuk, the town's patron saint.

Gallery

References

External links

 [ Philippine Standard Geographic Code]
 Sunstar News Travel Guide

Municipalities of Cebu